David Croft may refer to:

 David Croft (TV producer) (1922–2011), English writer, producer and actor
 David Croft (rugby union) (born 1979), Australian former rugby union player
 David Croft (broadcaster) (born 1970), English broadcaster for Sky Sports
 David Croft (Home and Away), a fictional character from the Australian soap opera Home and Away